Mickael Goudemand (born 9 March 1996) is a French professional rugby league footballer who plays as a  and  for the Catalans Dragons in the Betfred Super League and France at international level. 

Goudemand has previously played for SO Avignon in the Elite One Championship and the Dewsbury Rams in the Championship.

Background
Goudemand was born in Vaucluse, Avignon, Provence-Alpes-Côte d'Azur, France.

Playing career
In 2018 he made his Challenge Cup début for the Dragons against Whitehaven. In May 2018 he made his Super League début for Catalans against the Leeds Rhinos, scoring a try.

He played in the 2018 Challenge Cup Final victory over the Warrington Wolves at Wembley Stadium.

On 9 October 2021, he played for Catalans in their 2021 Super League Grand Final defeat against St. Helens.

References

External links
Catalans Dragons profile
SL profile
France profile
French profile

1996 births
Living people
Catalans Dragons players
Dewsbury Rams players
France national rugby league team players
Rugby league second-rows
Sporting Olympique Avignon players